Midland Township was a township in Bergen County, New Jersey, in the United States, that was formed on March 7, 1871, from portions of New Barbadoes Township.

History
Midland Township was hit hard by "Boroughitis" in 1894, when three boroughs were formed from portions of the township (and other townships, as indicated): Delford (March 8, 1894; also included portions of Palisades Township; name changed to Oradell in 1920), Maywood (June 30, 1894) and Riverside (June 30, 1894; name changed to River Edge in 1930).  Paramus left the fold on April 4, 1922.

On November 5, 1929, the remnants of Midland Township became Rochelle Park.

Notes

References
"History of Bergen County, New Jersey, 1630-1923;" by "Westervelt, Frances A. (Frances Augusta), 1858-1942."
"Municipal Incorporations of the State of New Jersey (according to Counties)" prepared by the Division of Local Government, Department of the Treasury (New Jersey); December 1, 1958.

External links
Bergen County Townships and Municipalities
A Centennial Review of Bergen County Borough Fever 1894-95

Former townships in Bergen County, New Jersey
1871 establishments in New Jersey
1929 disestablishments in New Jersey